Texas A&M International University (TAMIU) is a public university in Laredo, Texas. It is part of the Texas A&M University System and home to over 8,500 students each academic semester.  TAMIU offers over 70 undergraduate and graduate degrees in four colleges.

History
1969: Established as a branch of Texas A&I University at Kingsville, and named Texas A&I University at Laredo, functioning as an upper-level University for juniors, seniors, and graduate students. The Senate bill was introduced by Wayne Connally, brother of Governor John B. Connally, Jr.
1977: University's name changes to Laredo State University.
1989: University joins The Texas A&M University System.
1993: Name changes to Texas A&M International University.
1995: An unsuccessful attempt is made to transfer TAMIU to the University of Texas System. TAMIU becomes a four-year University, welcomes its first freshman class and opens its new campus, the first new University campus constructed in Texas in over 25 years.
2004: Doctoral program in International Business Administration is launched.
2006: Early College High School joins TAMIU (in collaboration with Laredo Independent School District).
2009: 40th Anniversary Celebration (2009-2010) begins.
2010: Dedicates Autism Interventions Center.
2010: Dedicates new University Success Center.
2011:  Dining Center Expansion in Student Center opens.
2012: With the approval of The Texas A&M University System Board of Regents, the University Success Center is renamed the Senator Judith Zaffirini Student Success Center.  Formal dedication ceremonies are scheduled in September 2012.
2014: Enabled by legislation authored by State Senator Judith Zaffirini and approved by the 79th Texas Legislature in 2005, the University announced its historic launch of a University-level academy on its campus for highly gifted and motivated high school seniors, to be known thereafter as The Texas Academy of International and Science, Technology, Engineering and Math (STEM) Studies.

Academics
Texas A&M International University offers undergraduate, graduate, and doctoral degrees through four colleges. They include:

College of Arts and Sciences
A. R. Sanchez, Jr. School of Business
College of Education
College of Nursing and Health Sciences

Rankings
According to U.S. News & World Report in "2015 Best College Rankings" TAMIU has been moved up and ranked No. 20 in Top Public Regional Universities, West,  and in 2014 TAMIU's rank was 35th.

In 2015, The Economist Magazine's "List of America's Best Colleges" ranked TAMIU ninth in the nation, ahead of all other schools in Texas.

In 2013, the National Council on Teacher Quality, based in Washington, D.C., ranked TAMIU subpar in the matriculation of its education majors, of which there were some seven hundred graduates between 2009 and 2012. The institution received 2.5 on an 8.0 ranking system, or 1.5 for its elementary program and 1.0 for the secondary studies. TAMIU provides the majority of public school teachers to the two systems in Webb County. The programs were evaluated based on rigor, selectivity, and the level of mentorship provided to prospective educators.

TAMIU officials questioned the motive, methodology, and results of the study. University officials released a statement: "TAMIU joins other teacher-training programs from colleges of education across the nation in challenging the accuracy of NCTQ results that incorporate inaccurate data and inherently flawed research methodology." The NCTQ was founded in 2000 by the conservative think tank, the Thomas B. Fordham Institute. TAMIU suggested that the NCTQ favors the dismantling of university teacher education programs with "bargain-basement online programs, some of which are directed by NCTQ surrogates." TAMIU questioned why no NCTQ researcher visited the campus but instead based its evaluation on information sent primarily to the Washington office via emails.

The TAMIU program was placed on probation in February 2013 by the Texas Board of Educator Certification. Though 70 percent of the TAMIU education graduates passed the certification examination, state accountability standards require an 80 percent completion rate to avoid probationary status. TAMIU President Ray Keck noted that Texas Tech, Rutgers, Syracuse, and Stanford universities all fared poorly in the NCTQ study as well and asked, "Do you honestly believe those universities run slipshod programs in education?" In July 2014, the University was notified by the State Board for Educator Certification (SBEC) that its full accreditation status had been restored.

In 2014, the College Affordability and Transparency Center, a project of the U.S. Department of Education, ranked the university sixth in the nation for lowest net price among public four-year universities.

Research
TAMIU is home to various research centers, including the Binational Center, Center for the Study of Western Hemispheric Trade, The Western Hemispheric Trade Information Center,  the Texas Center for Border Economics and Enterprise Development, the Small Business Development Center and the Center for Earth and Environmental Studies.

Benefactors
One of the institution's largest private benefactors was Radcliffe Killam (1910-2007), a Laredo oilman who donated $2 million to establish The Center for Western Hemispheric Trade, in addition to the University's  campus land. Killam and his wife, the former Sue Spivey, were honored by TAMIU with honorary doctorates and the naming of the Radcliffe and Sue Killam Library.

Athletics

The Texas A&M International (TAMIU) athletic teams are called the Dustdevils. The university is a member of the Division II level of the National Collegiate Athletic Association (NCAA), primarily competing in the Lone Star Conference (LSC) since the 2019–20 academic year. The Dustdevils previously competed in the D-II Heartland Conference from 2006–07 to 2018–19 and in the Red River Athletic Conference (RRAC) of the National Association of Intercollegiate Athletics (NAIA) from 2002–03 to 2005–06.

TAMIU competes in 13 intercollegiate varsity sports: Men's sports included baseball, basketball, cross country, golf and soccer; while women's sports include basketball, cross country, golf, soccer, softball and volleyball; and co-ed sports include cheerleading and dance.

Move to NCAA Division II
The Dustdevils became active members of NCAA Division II on September 1, 2008. As an active member, TAMIU is eligible for conference championships and NCAA tournament berths.

Rebranding
In August 2014, the Dustdevil Athletics Department launched a new team logo and marks for the NCAA Division II programs.

Accomplishments
 Men's basketball (2010 and 2013 Heartland Conference Tournament Championship)
 Women's basketball (2013 Heartland Conference Champions)
 Men's soccer (2003 Red River Athletic Conference Champions, 2010 Heartland Conference Title)
 Women's volleyball (2002 West Division Athletics Conference Champions)
 Softball (2010 Heartland Conference Tournament Championship)

Notable alumni
Esther Buckley, member of the United States Commission on Civil Rights, 1983-1992; Laredo educator
Henry Cuellar, member of the United States House of Representatives since 2005
Rodney Lewis, oil and natural gas industrialist
Juan Perez, Wisconsin politician
Tano Tijerina, former pitcher for minor-league teams of the Milwaukee Brewers, incoming County Judge of Webb County

Notable faculty
Ned Kock, information systems professor and human evolution theorist
Rafael A. Lecuona, former Olympic gymnast and late political science professor
Jerry D. Thompson, historian and award-winning author of multiple books on the American Southwest

Gallery

References

External links

 
 Official athletics website

 
Public universities and colleges in Texas
Texas A&M University System
Education in Laredo, Texas
Universities and colleges accredited by the Southern Association of Colleges and Schools
Buildings and structures in Laredo, Texas